The 2016 Judo Grand Prix Qingdao was held at the Guoxin Gymnasium in Qingdao, China, from 18 to 20 November 2016.

Medal summary

Men's events

Women's events

Source Results

Medal table

References

External links
 

2016 IJF World Tour
2016 Judo Grand Prix
Judo
Judo competitions in China
Judo